Jadranka Kosor (born 1 July 1953) is a Croatian politician and former journalist who served as Prime Minister of Croatia from 2009 to 2011, having taken office following the sudden resignation of her predecessor Ivo Sanader. Kosor was the first and so far only woman to become Prime Minister of Croatia since independence.

Kosor started working as a journalist, following her graduation from the Zagreb Faculty of Law. During the Croatian War of Independence, she hosted a radio show dealing with refugee problems and disabled war veterans. She joined the centre-right Croatian Democratic Union (HDZ) in 1989 and quickly climbed up the party hierarchy. In 1995 she was elected party vice-president and was elected to serve in Parliament for the first time. After the death of president and longtime HDZ leader Franjo Tuđman, Kosor supported Ivo Sanader's successful party leadership bid in 2000. Three years later, her party won the parliamentary election and Kosor became the Minister of Family, Veterans' Affairs and Inter-generational Solidarity in the Sanader first and, later, Sanader second cabinet, during which time she served as deputy prime minister as well. In the 2005 presidential election she ran as a representative of the HDZ, but lost to incumbent President Stjepan Mesić in the second round. After the abrupt resignation of Sanader, Kosor managed to form a functioning parliamentary majority and was approved to her new post as prime minister in July 2009, also becoming leader of her party. Kosor was the party's candidate for prime minister in the 2011 general election, but HDZ lost in a landslide over the centre-left Kukuriku coalition, led by the Social Democratic Party. Kosor handed power to the new Prime Minister, Zoran Milanović, in December 2011.

As prime minister, Kosor failed to commit to structural reforms although she managed to prevent country's budgetary meltdown with two budget revisions and the introduction of new taxes as a response to the ongoing economic crisis. During her tenure, she strongly advocated a zero-tolerance policy to political corruption and organized crime. This uncompromising stance, along with the new criminal code passed before her term began, opened the door to unprecedented efforts to combat corruption. This resulted in numerous arrests of influential business-people and politicians from across the political spectrum, although most of them members of HDZ, which severely damaged the party's reputation. The discoveries made by prosecutors were far-reaching and criminal charges were even raised against former Prime Minister Ivo Sanader and Deputy Prime Minister Damir Polančec, who would later be charged with lengthy prison sentences for criminal activity and abuse of power. In foreign policy, Kosor and her Slovenian counterpart Borut Pahor were successful in solving the long-standing border dispute and she is credited with successfully finishing the negotiating process of the Croatian accession to the European Union. On 9 December 2011, she and President Ivo Josipović signed the EU Treaty of Accession in Brussels. A moderate conservative, Kosor ran for another term as party leader after losing the election, however, was defeated by the more conservative Tomislav Karamarko. After months of criticizing his leadership and the new party platform, she was expelled from HDZ by the party's High Court for damaging the party's reputation.

In 2021, Kosor was awarded with the Grand Order of Queen Jelena with Sash and Morning Star by President of Croatia Zoran Milanović for "extraordinary contribution to the international position and reputation of the Republic of Croatia" and for "the development of relations between the Republic of Croatia and the Croatian people and other states and peoples."

Early life
Jadranka Kosor was born in Lipik to Zorica Belan and Mirko Kosor. She finished primary education in Pakrac. Her parents divorced when she was two, and she spent her childhood living with her grandmother. Her childhood friends describe her as a pretty, smart, and sociable girl that loved poetry and wrote songs. She contested on beauty pageant and was selected runner up for Miss Swimming Pool of Lipik.  She studied in Zagreb, where she graduated in law and began working as a journalist from 1972 as a correspondent for Večernji list and Radio Zagreb. In 1971, her book of poetry Koraci was published by the Pakrac branch of Matica hrvatska. During the Croatian War of Independence, she worked as a radio-journalist and her show exploited war topics such as refugee problems and disabled war veterans. She also worked briefly as a correspondent for the BBC during this time.

Politics

In 1995, Kosor became a representative in the Croatian Parliament as a member of the Croatian Democratic Union (HDZ). She was also the vice-president of the Croatian Parliament. From 1999 to 2000, she was president of the HDZ's Women's Association Katarina Zrinski. She is credited with the number of female candidates from the HDZ in the 2000 elections doubling.

Kosor was the vice-president of the HDZ party between 1995 and 1997, and from 2002 up to 2009 when she became the president of the party. In 2003, she became the minister in the Croatian department for Family, Veterans and Inter-generational Solidarity in the Croatian Government of Ivo Sanader.

HDZ nominated her as their presidential candidate for the presidential election of 2005. In the first round, she overtook Boris Mikšić by a few percent to reach the second place. She then faced off Stipe Mesić in the second round, but lost.

In July 2009, she was politically installed as the head of the Croatian Democratic Union following the resignation of Ivo Sanader.

Prime Minister

On 1 July 2009, Croatian Prime Minister Ivo Sanader suddenly and unexpectedly resigned, and suggested Kosor as the next prime minister. With the support of the coalition partners Kosor went to the President Stjepan Mesić who invited her to form a government. This resulted in the formation of the Kosor cabinet which contained most members of the previous Sanader administration. On July 6, Parliament approved the proposed cabinet with 83 votes in favor out of 153 members and Kosor was confirmed as the first female Prime Minister of Croatia after independence - actually the third in the history of the republic after two female Prime Ministers of Socialist Republic of Croatia. The Opposition was not pleased with this development calling Sanader a coward and Kosor his puppet saying that an early general election was necessary.

Domestic policy

In the first month of her term Kosor, faced with a huge deficit and high unemployment, introduced an emergency budget aimed to reduce spending and the national debt. One of the most unpopular austerity measures taken along with the introduction of the budget was a new income tax called the "crisis tax". In addition, the value-added tax rate was increased from 22% to 23%. Businesses criticized the tax hikes as well as the idea of tax code changes in the middle of the fiscal year as an unreasonable burden, while independent economists mostly noted how new taxes would cut consumer spending and further slow down the economy. The Opposition criticized the new measures heavily, calling the crisis tax harač, a historical Turkish loanword representing a tax implemented during the Ottoman Empire in the late Middle Ages. Indeed, the government's handling of finances was unpopular among the public resulting in the Prime Minister's dismal approval rating of 32% by the end of her first month.

In the last quarter of 2009, many public officials, as well as members of the boards of various government agencies, became suspected of participating in corrupt activities. An unprecedented number of officials were detained and arrested under these allegations which resulted in both praise and criticism of Kosor's government. The praise was mostly directed by those who believed that the government had finally taken a stronger stance against political corruption, while others criticized the fact that most suspects were, in fact, members of Kosor's own Croatian Democratic Union. The Opposition accused the government, especially the Prime Minister, for political responsibility claiming that it was impossible that Kosor didn't know what was happening around her when she was a Vice President of the government almost seven years before becoming Prime Minister. The accusations grew louder as more and more corruption affairs were tied with the former Prime Minister Ivo Sanader. On 30 October 2009 Damir Polančec, member of the HDZ Presidency, resigned as Deputy Prime Minister and Minister of the Economy following allegations of corruption.

On 3 January 2010, Ivo Sanader announced he was returning to active politics saying it was a mistake he ever left. He accused Kosor and the members of the HDZ Presidency of failed leadership citing Andrija Hebrang's poor result in the first round of the presidential election held just a week earlier. Hebrang received, for HDZ as the largest party in the country, an embarrassing 12% of the votes claiming third place, the lowest result for an HDZ presidential candidate ever. Ivo Josipović, the candidate of the largest opposition party, the Social Democratic Party, won a landslide victory in the resulting runoff on 10 January. Most political pundits, as well as the majority of the public, believed the true reason of Sanader's surprise return was fear that he will eventually be tied with the numerous corruption scandals which have emerged since he left office. On 4 January, the day after Sanader's coup as it was called by the press, the HDZ Presidency decided to evict Sanader from the party. The Croatian public quickly rallied in support of Kosor against the hugely unpopular former prime minister, resulting in the highest support for any Prime Minister since polling began, topping at 77% by the end of February.

Throughout 2010, the economy topped corruption as the biggest concern of the government, and the enthusiasm for Kosor and her government soon wore off. Industry shed tens of thousands of jobs, and unemployment soared. Consumer spending reduced drastically compared to record 2007 levels, causing widespread problems in the trade as well as transport industries. The import/export balance did derive a benefit from a large decrease in imports and a more tempered decrease in exports. The continuing declining standard resulted in a quick fall in both the Prime Minister's as well as government's support. In June, Kosor proposed loosening the labor law and making it more business-friendly. This was greatly opposed by the unions who have organized a petition against the proposed changes demanding a referendum on the issue. The petition was signed by over 700,000 citizens, unprecedented in Croatia. Just as the 2010 Croatian labour law referendum was being prepared, the government decided to drop the proposed changes. The Constitutional Court ultimately declared the referendum issue moot, but ordered the government not to subject any changes to the labor law in the following year. This was seen as a legal way to avoid the referendum which many speculated would be a referendum on the Government rather than on the labor law. The unions criticized the move calling it undemocratic, announcing protests.

In August 2011, at the official celebration of Victory Day, Kosor sent a public greeting to Croatian generals Ante Gotovina and Mladen Markač who were in April of the same year found guilty in a first instance verdict of war crimes and crimes against humanity by ICTY. In 2012, they were both acquitted by the ICTY's Appeals Panel and released from custody. Kosor's statement was criticized by Serbian president Boris Tadić, leader of the Independent Democratic Serb Party (SDSS) Milorad Pupovac, Deputy Prime Minister Slobodan Uzelac (SDSS), as well as by leaders of the opposition Social Democratic Party and Croatian People's Party. Amnesty International expressed concerns.

Foreign relations

Jadranka Kosor signed an agreement with Borut Pahor, the prime minister of Slovenia, in November 2009, that ended Slovenia's blockade of Croatia's EU accession and allowed Croatian EU entry negotiations to proceed. On 9 December 2011, Prime Minister Kosor and President Ivo Josipović signed EU Accession Treaty in Brussels.

Standing in opinion polls

Post-premiership

Following HDZ's defeat at the 2011 parliamentary election, Kosor handed over power to newly elected prime minister, Social Democrat Zoran Milanović. On 23 December 2011, Kosor was elected Deputy Speaker of the Croatian Parliament and was also chairwoman of the HDZ's Deputy Club and leader of the opposition. Kosor contested 2012 HDZ leadership election and came in third out of five candidates. A moderate conservative, Kosor continuously publicly criticized Tomislav Karamarko's leadership and the new, more conservative, party platform. In 2012, she testified at the trial in the Fimi Media corruption case against Ivo Sanader. On 12 June 2012, Kosor and Vladimir Šeks were removed from the positions of Deputy Speakers. In 2013, she was expelled from HDZ for "damaging the reputation of the party".

Kosor continued as an independent, considerably more liberal, politician and eventually formed a deputy club with two Croatian Civic Party MPs. Kosor voted in favour of presenting the issue of the 2013 referendum on banning same-sex marriage before the Constitutional Court, and against the proposed Constitutional change which represented a change from her previous position on homosexuality and same-sex marriage since she had been known for being against the expansion of LGBT rights. She also voted for the Life Partnership Act which gave same-sex couples in Croatia rights equal to heterosexual married couples. After receiving death threats in 2015, Kosor was granted police protection.  After speculation that she might be the SDP's candidate, Kosor eventually decided to participate in the 2015 parliamentary election as a candidate for the liberal Successful Croatia coalition in the 5th electoral district. She wasn't elected to the parliament. She continued to criticize Tomislav Karamarko and Kolinda Grabar-Kitarović as well as Bridge of Independent Lists party for their indecisiveness. In February 2016, she called on Prime Minister Tihomir Orešković to remove Zlatko Hasanbegović from the position of the Minister of Culture after photograph of him wearing a cap with an Ustaše badge was published. In August 2016, Kosor stated that yelling Za dom spremni was "an insult to war veterans and their friends who gave their lives for a democratic, independent, and free Croatia".

Kosor is very active on Twitter where she writes on daily events and statements by politicians. She also maintains a personal blog - "Day After Yesterday - On Obverses and Reverses of Politics". In 2017, she published a book which included texts she wrote on her blog and columns written for the Slovenian leftist newspaper Dnevnik in the period from 2015 to 2017 in which she commented on Croatian interior and foreign politics.

Personal life

Jadranka Kosor was married twice; between 1971 and 1981 to Hrvoje Markul, an editor of the HTV Entertainment Program, and between 1984 and 1993 to Ivo Škopljanac, the radio host. Her son Lovro Škopljanac (b. 1984) works as a senior assistant at the Department of Comparative Literature at the Zagreb Faculty of Humanities and Social Sciences.

She has published five books - two of poetry, two related to the Croatian War of Independence and one containing her comments on Croatian politics. Kosor received The Golden Pen Award of the Croatian Journalists' Association, European Union's Humanitarian Award, European Circle Award of the Croatian European House and HRT's Lifetime Achievement Award "Ivan Šibl". She is an honorary member of the Association of Parents of Deceased Veterans, Honorary Vice President of the Association of the Deafblind "Dodir", Honorary President of the Association of Homeland Defence War Veterans - HVIDRA, Honorary President of the Association of Croatian Homeland Defence War Veterans Treated for PTSD of the Šibenik-Knin County - "Tvrđava Knin" and Honorary President of the International Committee of Humanists for the Protection of Children and Families from Abuse and Violence.

References

External links

 Jadranka Kosor's CV at the Croatian Government website

|-

|-

|-

1953 births
Candidates for President of Croatia
Croatian Democratic Union politicians
Faculty of Law, University of Zagreb alumni
Living people
People from Pakrac
Prime Ministers of Croatia
Representatives in the modern Croatian Parliament
Veterans' affairs ministers of Croatia
Women prime ministers
Women government ministers of Croatia
Lipik
21st-century Croatian women politicians
21st-century Croatian politicians